Rathinirvedam is a 2011 Indian Malayalam-language Erotic film directed by T. K. Rajeev Kumar and produced by  Revathy Kalamandhir. Starring Shweta Menon and Sreejith Vijay. It is a remake of the 1978 film of the same name, which itself was based on the novel of the same name written by P. Padmarajan. The film was produced by G. Suresh Kumar under the banner of Revathy Kalamandhir. It stars Shweta Menon in the role of Rathi, and Sreejith in the role of Pappu. Shooting was done in the Onnattukara area of Kayamkulam and Mavelikkara, where the story is primarily set.

Synopsis
Takes place in a village surrounded by hills and valleys. Pappu, a teenager, awaiting high school results to go to college, has plenty of time on hand. His trouble is adolescence, but neither his mother nor his aunt can diagnose his affliction. Everything around him excites and stimulates his sexual arousal. Twenty plus Rathi, the girl next door, has been a friend to him since he was a child. Unaware of the stirrings of his desire, she dismisses his first overtures to her as boyish pranks. But soon her feelings change rest forms the story.

Cast
 Shweta Menon as Rathi
 Sreejith Vijay as Pappu
 Manianpilla Raju as Pattalam Maman
 Shammi Thilakan as Krishnan Nair
 Guinness Pakru as Kochummini
 K. P. A. C. Lalitha as Narayani
 Maya Viswanath as Bharathi 
 Shobha Mohan as Saraswathy
 Master Ananthapadmanabhan as Govindan
 Baby Ammu as Kunchi
 Baby Meera as Shanthi

Reception

Box office
Rathinirvedam was one of the top grossed film of the year, compared to its low cost.

Soundtrack

Awards
 2011 Kerala State Film Awards

 Won, Best Male Singer - Sudheep Kumar – "Chembakapoonkavile"
 Won, Best Female Singer - Shreya Ghoshal – "Kannoram Chingaram"

References

External links
 

 Metro Manorama Special Website

2010s Malayalam-language films
Films scored by M. Jayachandran
2010s erotic drama films
2010s coming-of-age drama films
Films based on Indian novels
Films set in 1978
Indian coming-of-age drama films
Indian erotic drama films
Films shot in Alappuzha
Remakes of Indian films
Films with screenplays by Padmarajan
Films directed by T. K. Rajeev Kumar
2011 drama films
2011 films